The Metropolis of Kastoria is one of the metropolises of the New Lands in Greece that are within the jurisdiction of the Ecumenical Patriarchate of Constantinople but de facto are administered for practical reasons as part of the Church of Greece under an agreement between the churches of Athens and Constantinople.

Kastoria is also a Latin Catholic titular see, and in the early 20th century hosted a Bulgarian Orthodox bishopric.

History 

At first a suffragan of Thebes, the bishopric was, at least by the reign of Basil II in the early 11th century, the first suffragan see of the Archbishopric of Ohrid. Le Quien mentions only three bishops, all of the period after the East–West Schism: Joasaph in 1564, Hierotheus, who went to Rome about 1650, and Dionysius Mantoucas; but that list can easily be extended.

In the early 20th century the town was the seat of a Bulgarian Orthodox bishopric with 2,224 families, 32 priests, and 22 churches.

Today, for the Ecumenical Patriarchate of Constantinople and the Church of Greece the see is the Metropolis of Kastoria and Exarchate for Upper Macedonia, in the so-called "New Lands" of Greece.

On October 3, 2019 the Holy Synod of the Patriarchate of Constantinople resolved to glorify seven New Martyrs of Kastoria, at the proposal of Metropolitan Seraphim (Papakostas) of Kastoria, including the following:

 New Martyr Markos Markoulis of Kleisoura, Kastoria, hanged in Argos Orestiko (1598)
 New Martyr Ioannis Noultzos, martyred together with his brother and brother-in-law in Kastoria (1696)
 New Martyr George of Kastoria, martyred by the Hagarenes in the Acarnania region. 
 New Hieromartyr Vasilios Kalapaliki, priest of Chiliodendro, Kastoria (gr) (1902)
 New Hieromartyr Archimandrite Platon (Aivazidis), Protosyncellus of Metropolitan Germanos Karavangelis (1921)

The "Synaxis of the Saints of Kastoria" is a moveable feast that is held on the Third Sunday of November.

Greek Orthodox Metropolitans

 Kallinikos (Georgatos) 2021

 Seraphim (Papakostas) 1996–2020 
 Gregorios III (Papoutsopoulos) 1985-1996 
 Gregorios II (Maistros) 1974-1985 
 Dorotheos (Giannaropoulos) 1958-1973 
 Nikiphoros II (Papasideris) 1936-1958 
 Ioakeim (Leptidis) 1911-1931 
 Ioakeim (Vaxevanidis) 1908-1911 
 Germanos (Karavangelis) 1900-1908
 Athanasios (Kapouralis) 1899-1900
 Philaretos (Vafeidis) 1889-1899
 Gregorios (Drakopoulos) 1888-1889
 Kyrillos (Dimitriadis) 1882-1888
 Constantine (Isaakidis) 1880-1882
 Hilarion 1874-1879
 Nicephorus I 1841-1874
 Athanasions (Mitilinaios) 1836-1841

Active Greek Orthodox Monasteries

For men

 Dormition of the Virgin Mary - Panagia Mavriotissa
 Agion Anargyroi Melissotopos
 Agia Paraskevi Vasileiadou
 Agios Georgios Eptahoriou

For women

 Monastery of the Nativity of the Virgin of Kleisoura
 Saint Nicholas Tsirilovou
 Panagias Faneromenis
 Monastery of St. George Melanthiou

Latin bishopric 

Some ten Latin bishops of Castoria are known from the 13th to the 15th centuries.

Latin titular see 
 
Castoria is listed by the Catholic Church as a titular bishopric since the 15th century.

It is vacant for decades, having had the following incumbents, all of the lowest (episcopal) rank :
 Silvestro de Benedetti, Vallombrosian Benedictines (O.S.B. Vall.) (1432.01.23 – ?)
 Francis Sexello, Friars Minor (O.F.M.) (1507.01.07 – ?)
 Juan López (1520.09.22 – ?)
 François Daussayo, Augustinian Order (O.E.S.A.) (1531.03.18 – ?)
 Gedeon van der Gracht (1536.01.10 – ?)
 Charles Pinello, O.E.S.A. (1546.04.16 – ?)
 Esteban de Esmir (1639.04.03 – 1641.01.05)
 Johannes van Neercassel, Oratorians (C.O.) (1662.06.23 – 1686.06.06)
 Gioachino Maria de’ Oldo (1725.03.03 – 1726.12.09)
 Bishop-elect Paolino Sandulli, O.S.B. (1727.03.17 – ?)
 John Mary of St. Thomas Albertini, Discalced Carmelites (O.C.D.) (1780.12.23 – 1783?)
 Charles Lamothe, Paris Foreign Missions Society (M.E.P.) (1793.02.05 – 1816.05.22)
 Jean-Jacques Guérard, M.E.P. (1816.05.23 – 1823.06.18)
 Francisco Ferreira de Azevedo (1820.05.29 – 1844.07.25)
 Jean-François Ollivier, M.E.P. (1824.04.06 – 1827.05.27)
 Joseph-Marie-Pélagie Havard, M.E.P. (1828.03.21 – 1838.07.05)
 John Fennelly (1841.04.30 – 1868.01.23)
 Johann Jakob Kraft (1868.09.24 – 1884.06.09)
 Francesco Gašparić (1884.11.13 – 1897)
 Gaspar Felicjan Cyrtowt (1897.07.21 – 1910.04.07)
 Marie-Augustine Chapuis, M.E.P. (1911.03.06 – 1913.05.21)
 Ferenc Gossman (1913.07.01 – 1931.10.11)
 Joaquín Alcaide y Bueso, Capuchin Franciscans (O.F.M. Cap.) (1931.12.15 – 1943.02.21)
 Stanislas Courbe (1943.06.22 – 1971.04.22)

Notes

References

Bibliography

External links 
  Ιερά Μητρόπολη Καστοριάς. (Metropolis of Kastoria).

Dioceses of the Ecumenical Patriarchate of Constantinople
Dioceses of the Church of Greece
Kastoria
Kastoria (regional unit)
Kastoria
Eastern Orthodox dioceses in Greece